Villa Aldama is a municipality located in the central zone in the Tabasco, Mexico, about 33 km from the state capital Villahermosa. It has a surface of 78.96 km2. The municipality takes this name in honor of Don Juan Aldama, who was one of the revolutionary commanders in the Mexican War of Independence.

Geography

The municipality of Villa Aldama is bordered to the north by Las Minas and Altotonga, to the east by Las Vigas and to the south by Perote.

Agriculture

It produces principally maize, beans and potatoes.

Celebrations
Every July, a festival is held to celebrate Saint John the Apostle, patron of the town, and in December there is a festival held in honor of the Virgin of Guadalupe.

Weather

The weather in Villa Aldama is cold and wet all year with rains in summer and autumn.

References

External links 

  Municipal Official webpage
  Municipal Official Information

Municipalities of Veracruz